Denys Kovalenko (born 1991) is a Ukrainian sprint canoer. He is a silver medalists of the World Championships and medalist of the European Championships.

References

External links
Ukrainian Canoe Federation

Ukrainian male canoeists
Living people
ICF Canoe Sprint World Championships medalists in Canadian
1991 births
Yuzhne
Sportspeople from Odesa Oblast
21st-century Ukrainian people